New Democracy (ND;) is a liberal-conservative, political party in Greece. In contemporary Greek politics, New Democracy has been the main centre-right political party and one of the two major parties along with its historic rival, the Panhellenic Socialist Movement (PASOK). New Democracy and PASOK were created in the wake of the toppling of the military junta in 1974, and ruled Greece alternately for the next four decades. Following the electoral decline of PASOK, New Democracy remained one of the two major parties in Greece, the other being the Coalition of the Radical Left (SYRIZA).

Having spent four and a half years in opposition to SYRIZA's government, New Democracy regained its majority in the Hellenic Parliament and returned to government under Kyriakos Mitsotakis after the 2019 legislative election.

The support of New Democracy comes from a wide electorate base ranging from centrists to conservatives, and nationalists to post-modernists. From a geographical perspective, its main support base is in the rural areas of Greece as well as the city centers of Athens and Thessaloniki. Its support is generally weaker in areas like, Arta, Achaia and Crete, with the exception of some parts in Chania and Rethymno. Traditionally, New Democracy receives greatest percentages in Laconia, Messenia, Kastoria and Serres.

The party was founded in 1974 by Konstantinos Karamanlis and in the same year it formed the first cabinet of the Third Hellenic Republic. New Democracy is a member of the European People's Party, the largest European political party since 1999, the Centrist Democrat International, and the International Democrat Union.

History

Foundation

New Democracy was founded on 4 October 1974 by Konstantinos Karamanlis, in the beginning of the metapolitefsi era following the fall of the Greek military junta. Karamanlis, who had already served as Prime Minister of Greece from 1955 to 1963, was sworn in as the first Prime Minister of the Third Hellenic Republic in a national unity government on 24 July 1974, until the first free elections of the new era. He intended New Democracy to be a more modern and progressive political party than the right-wing parties that ruled Greece before the 1967 Greek coup d'état, including his own National Radical Union (ERE). The party's ideology was defined as "radical liberalism", a term defined as "the prevalence of free market rules with the decisive intervention of the state in favour of social justice." The party was formed out of dissident members the pre-Junta Centre Union and National Radical Union, both of former Monarchists and Venizelists.

First government (1974–1981)
In the 1974 legislative election, New Democracy obtained a massive parliamentary majority of 220 seats with a record 54.37% of the vote, a result attributed to the personal appeal of Karamanlis to the electorate. Karamanlis was elected as Prime Minister and soon decided to hold a referendum on 8 December 1974 for the issue of the form of government; with a large majority of 69.17%, monarchy was eventually abolished in favour of a republic. The next major issue for the New Democracy cabinet was the creation of the Constitution of Greece, which entered into force in 1975 and established Greece as a parliamentary republic. On 12 June 1975, Greece applied to join the European Communities, of which it was already an associate member since 1961, while it had already been readmitted to the Council of Europe on 28 November 1974.

In the 1977 election, New Democracy won again a large parliamentary majority of 171 seats, albeit with a reduced percentage of popular vote (41.84%). Under Karamanlis, Greece redefined its relations with NATO and tried to resolve the Cyprus dispute following the Turkish invasion of the island. In 1979, the first conference of the party was held in Chalkidiki, where its ideological principles defined under the term "radical liberalism" were unanimously approved, as well as its statute and the operating regulations of its organizations. It was the first conference of any Greek political party whose delegates were elected by the members.

Karamanlis' vision concerning the accession of Greece into the European Communities, despite the resolute opposition of the Panhellenic Socialist Movement (PASOK) and the Communist Party of Greece (KKE), led to the signing of the Treaty of Accession on 28 May 1979 in Athens; following the ratification of the act by the Hellenic Parliament on 28 June 1979, Greece became the tenth member state of the European Communities on 1 January 1981. Karamanlis was criticised by opposing parties for not holding a referendum, even though Greece's accession into the European Communities had been in the forefront of New Democracy's political platform, under which the party had been elected to power. Meanwhile, Karamanlis relinquished the premiership in 1980 and was elected as President of Greece by the parliament, serving until 1985. Georgios Rallis was elected as the new leader of New Democracy and succeeded Karamanlis in premiership.

Opposition and Mitsotakis' rise to power (1981–1989) 
Under the leadership of Georgios Rallis, New Democracy was defeated in the 1981 legislative elections by Andreas Papandreou's PASOK which ran on a left-wing progressive platform, and was placed in opposition for a first time with 35.87% share of the vote and 115 seats. On the same day, on 18 October 1981, New Democracy was also defeated in the first Greek election to the European Parliament. In the following December, the party's parliamentary group elected Evangelos Averoff, former Minister for National Defence, as president of New Democracy, but he resigned in 1984 due to health problems. On 1 September 1984, Konstantinos Mitsotakis succeeded him in the party's presidency and he managed to increase its percentage in the 1985 elections to 40.85%, although it was defeated again and remained in opposition.

Second government (1989–1993) 

Mitsotakis led New Democracy to a clear win in the June 1989 legislative elections registering 44.28% of the vote but, due to the modification of the electoral law by the outbound PASOK government, New Democracy obtained only 145 seats which were not enough to form a government on its own. The aftermath was the formation of a coalition government under Tzannis Tzannetakis, consisted of New Democracy and Coalition of the Left and Progress (Synaspismos), with the latter also including at the time the Communist Party of Greece. In the subsequent elections of November 1989, New Democracy took one more comfortable win, increasing its share to 46.19% of the vote and 148 seats but, under the same electoral law, they were still short of forming a government and this led to a national unity government along with PASOK and Synaspismos, under Xenophon Zolotas.

Eventually, in the 1990 election Mitsotakis' New Democracy defeated once again Papandreou's PASOK with a lead of 8.28%, but this time the 46.89% of votes awarded them with 150 seats, which allowed Mitsotakis to form a majority in the parliament with the support of Democratic Renewal's (DIANA) sole member of parliament and one more seat given by the Supreme Special Court, after a mistake in seat calculation was detected. After three consecutive wide wins with high vote percentages, Mitsotakis became the 178th Prime Minister of Greece and the 7th Prime Minister of the 3rd Hellenic Republic though with a slim parliamentary majority of 152 seats due to the electoral law in force at the time.

In a turbulent international political environment following the 1989 Fall of Communism in Europe, Mitsotakis' government focused on cutting government spending, the privatization of state enterprises, the reformation of the public administration and the restoration of the original electoral system, with the addition of an election threshold of 3%. In foreign policy, the priorities were the restoration of confidence among Greece's economic and political partners, NATO and the United States. Mitsotakis also supported a new dialogue with Turkey on the Cyprus dispute and a compromise over the Macedonia naming dispute; the latter triggered an irritation among the MPs of New Democracy, which led Antonis Samaras to leave it and form a new political party in June 1993, Political Spring; one more withdrawal later from its parliamentary group resulted in New Democracy's loss of the majority in the parliament and the call of early elections.

Opposition (1993–2004) 
In the 1993 elections, New Democracy suffered an easy defeat with 39.30% of the vote, something that led to Mitsotakis' resignation and the election of Miltiadis Evert in the party's leadership. In the early 1996 legislative election, New Democracy was defeated again by Costas Simitis' PASOK registering 38.12%, but Evert obtained a re-election as the party's leader in the same year. However, in the spring of 1997 a new conference took place, in order to elect a new president among others. Kostas Karamanlis, nephew of the party's founder, was elected the sixth president of New Democracy.

Under Karamanlis, New Democracy experienced an evident increase in popularity, but in the 2000 elections they lost by only 1.06% of the popular vote, the smallest margin in modern Greek history, registering 42.74% and obtaining 125 seats in the parliament. By 2003, New Democracy was consistently leading Simitis' PASOK in opinion polls; in January 2004 Simitis resigned and announced elections for 7 March, while George Papandreou succeeded him in PASOK's leadership.

Third government (2004–2009) 
Despite speculation that Papandreou would succeed in restoring the party's fortunes, in the 2004 election Karamanlis managed to take a clear win with 45.36% of the vote and 165 seats, and New Democracy returned to power after eleven years in opposition, scoring an all-time record of 3,359,682 votes in the history of Greek elections. The regions that consistently support New Democracy include the Peloponnese, Central Macedonia and West Macedonia. On the other hand, the party is weak in Crete, the Aegean Islands, Attica and West Greece.

On 16 September 2007, Kostas Karamanlis won re-election with a diminished majority in Parliament, and stated: "Thank you for your trust. You have spoken loud and clear and chosen the course the country will take in the next few years." George Papandreou, PASOK, accepted defeat (New Democracy party with 41.84%, and opposition party PASOK had 38.1%).

2009 defeat

On 2 September 2009 Karamanlis announced his intention to call an election, although one was not required until September 2011. The parliament was dissolved on 9 September, and the 2009 legislative election was held on 4 October. New Democracy's share of the parliamentary vote dropped to 33.47% (down by 8.37%) and they won only 91 of 300 seats, dropping by 61 since the last election. The rival PASOK soared to 43.92% (up 5.82%), and took 160 seats (up 58). The 33.5% tally marked a historic low for the party since its founding in 1974. Karamanlis conceded defeat and stated that he would resign as a leader of New Democracy, and would not stand as a candidate at the next party election. Two former Ministers for Foreign Affairs, Dora Bakoyannis and Antonis Samaras, as well as Thessaloniki Prefect Panagiotis Psomiadis were announced as candidates, with Samaras being the favorite to win.

On 29 November 2009, Antonis Samaras was elected the new leader of New Democracy by the party base at the 2009 leadership election. Following early results showing Samaras in the lead, his main rival Dora Bakoyannis conceded defeat and congratulated Samaras for his election; later she left New Democracy to found her own party, Democratic Alliance. Samaras himself had also left New Democracy in 1992 because of his hard stance on the Macedonia naming dispute and found his own party, Political Spring; he returned to New Democracy in 2004.

2011 government debt crisis 
New Democracy was in opposition during the first phase (2009–11) of the Greek government debt crisis which included the First bailout package agreed in May 2010. The party did not support the first EU/IMF rescue package of May 2010 and the three related austerity packages of March 2010, May 2010 and June 2011. Further measures were agreed by prime minister George Papandreou with the EU and private banks and insurers on 27 October 2011. The aim was to complete negotiations by the end of the year and put in place a full Second bailout package to supplement the one agreed in May 2010. Samaras initially blasted the deal. In reality New Democracy had dismissed cross-party agreement even before the deal was agreed.

A few days later, Papandreou announced a surprise referendum. During the frantic negotiations that followed, Samaras offered to support the austerity package he had initially condemned if Papandreou resigned and an interim government be appointed to lead the country to elections early in the new year.

The referendum was never held, and Papandreou resigned in early November 2011. New Democracy supported the new national unity government headed by Lucas Papademos; however the party's support for austerity appeared lukewarm at first.

Within a few days, party officials spoke of "renegotiating" existing agreements with the EU and IMF. EU partners requested that Samaras sign a letter committing him to the terms of the rescue package, in what was seen as an effort to keep the nationalist elements of his party happy. Samaras argued that his word should be enough and that the demand for a written commitment was "humiliating". Both Papademos and the EU insisted on a written commitment. New Democracy repeated its call for new elections. Samaras was said to be infuriating European leaders by only partly backing the international reform programme. A meeting of Eurozone's Finance Ministers was postponed in February 2012, when it became apparent that not all the main political parties were willing to pledge to honour the conditions demanded in return for the rescue package; a day later Samaras reversed course and wrote to the European Commission and IMF, promising to implement the austerity measures if his party were to win a general election in April. German finance minister Wolfgang Schäuble suggested postponing the election and setting up a small technocratic cabinet like Italy's to run Greece for the next two years.

Fourth government with PASOK (2012–2015) 
In May 2012 general election, the New Democracy regained the largest party but could not obtain a majority. Anti-austerity leftist SYRIZA, led by Alexis Tsipras became the second largest party and refused to negotiate with New Democracy and PASOK. After the general election the New Democracy could not form a coalition government.

New Democracy during its rule introduced a strict immigration policy, and proposed strengthening this policy as part of its political agenda.

In opposition (2015–2019) 
In its electoral campaign for the January 2015 legislative election, Samaras promised to continue with his plan to exit the bailout and return to growth by further privatizations, a corporate tax rate reduced to 15 percent and a recapitalization of Greece's banks. The party received a total of €747,214  of state funding, the largest share of all political parties in Greece. In the election, ND was defeated by SYRIZA. On 5 July 2015 Samaras stepped down from party leadership.

New Democracy was once again defeated by SYRIZA in the September 2015 legislative election, but maintained its number of seats in the Hellenic Parliament. On 10 January 2016 Kyriakos Mitsotakis was elected as new party leader.

On 4 October 2018, the party adopted a new logo.

Fifth government (2019–present) 
In the 2019 legislative election, New Democracy won 158 seats in the 300-seat Hellenic Parliament, a majority of the seats, enabling it to form a government on its own under Prime Minister Kyriakos Mitsotakis.

During the COVID-19 pandemic, Mitsotakis' efforts to deal with the prolonged lockdown in Greece received widespread praise from Greek and International press, analysts, and academics, for the well-structured approach and continuous reliance on scientific expertise of the Greek pandemic task force, headed by Sotiris Tsiodras. In 2021, the country managed to keep the new cases of COVID-19 to low levels by enforcing back to back strict lockdowns in Athens and Thessaloniki, and enabling different emergency protocols for rural areas. At the same time the government focused on tackling the pandemic before the launch of the 2021 summer tourist season in an attempt to boost the country's economy.

During Mitsotakis' term as PM, he has received praise for being pro-European and governing technocratic, his handling of the COVID-19 pandemic, his handling of migration, and his handling of the Greek economy, with Greece being named the Top Economic Performer for 2022 by the Economist. This was in particular due to Greece in 2022 being able to repay ahead of schedule 2.7 billion euros ($2.87 billion) of loans owed to euro zone countries under the first bailout it received during its decade-long debt crisis. Although Mitsotakis has also received criticism as Greece has experienced a democratic backsliding and heightened corruption, with a deterioration of freedom of the press, and was marred by the Novartis corruption scandal,  the 2022 wiretapping scandal and the fatal 2023 Tempi train collision.

Ideology
New Democracy political position has been placed as centre-right. The main ideologies of the party have been described as liberal-conservative, or conservative liberal, Christian democratic, and with a pro-European stance.

Electoral history

Hellenic Parliament elections 

Popular vote in Greek legislative elections

European Parliament elections 

A 2004 results are compared to the combined totals for ND and POLAN totals in the 1999 election.

Party leaders

Symbols
The traditional symbol of the party has been the freedom torch, incorporated in its logo, albeit in a stylized form in the logo adopted in 2018.

Logos

References

External links

Official website  
ND list of MPs_Vouliwatch.gr

 
Liberal conservative parties
International Democrat Union member parties
1974 establishments in Greece
Political parties established in 1974
Member parties of the European People's Party
Parties represented in the European Parliament
Conservative parties in Greece
Konstantinos Karamanlis
Centre-right parties in Europe
Christian democratic parties in Europe
Eastern Orthodox political parties
Liberal parties in Greece
Pro-European political parties in Greece